Section 165(c) of the United States Internal Revenue Code limits losses that taxpayers can deduct into three categories: business or trade losses, investment losses, and losses incurred from casualty or theft. A loss incurred by a taxpayer from the sale of the taxpayer's personal residential property is not deductible. Personal residential property losses do not fit under any of the enumerated categories under Internal Revenue Code section 165(c). Furthermore, Income Tax Treasury Regulation section 1.165-9 states that a loss sustained on the sale of residential property purchased or constructed by the taxpayer for use as his personal residence and so used by him up to the time of the sale is not deductible under Internal Revenue Code section 165(a).

However, if, prior to the sale of the personal residence, the taxpayer converts the residential property into a rental property, a loss sustained on the sale of the property will be deductible under Internal Revenue Code section 165(c)(2). To calculate the loss on residential property that was converted into a rental, prior to the sale of the property, Treasury Regulation section 1.165-9(2) states that the basis of the property will be the lesser of either the fair market value at the time of conversion or the adjusted basis determined under Treasury Regulation section 1.1011-1.

External links 
Tax law on the sale of inherited property is not settled.

Taxation in the United States